Suzanne Puanani Vares-Lum (born 1967) is the president of East–West Center in Honolulu, HI, and a former Major General in the United States Army.

In 2015, she became the first Native Hawaiian woman to become a general, and upon her appointment as president of East-West Center in 2021, became its first woman and the first Native Hawaiian to lead the organization since it was founded in 1960.

Vares-Lum was a career intelligence officer and an influential executive advising the most senior leadership of the United States Indo-Pacific Command (USINDOPACOM), where she played a key role in USINDOPACOM's effort to shape and maintain regional security through development of diplomatic, economic, and military policies. This included building and maintaining military-to-military and political-military relationships amongst the 43 nations within the Pacific region, engaging with senior leaders in the Department of Defense, local government, local communities, and Members of Congress.

Early life
Born and raised in Wahiawa, like many in Hawaii, Vares-Lum's ancestry reflects the multitude of cultural influences present in the state. Her mother is from Japan, while her father's family is Hawaiian, Portuguese, Tahitian, Chinese and English. Her father also instilled a strong sense of service, serving in Vietnam, and her sister also served.

She told Honolulu Civil Beat in 2021, "it’s not just (Hawaii's) geographic location that makes it a hub for the U.S. military and its allies. Because I’m from Hawaii, I would say it’s also our ability to bring cultures together, to understand cultural language in the background so that we can engage effectively in the region”.

Military career
Commissioned on May 15, 1988, through the ROTC program at the University of Hawaii at Manoa, Vares-Lum served on active duty as a Regular Army officer from 1989 to 1993 as the 103rd Military Intelligence Battalion Headquarters and Headquarters Support Company Executive Officer, the C Co., 103rd MI Trailblazer Platoon Leader, and the Division Artillery Fire Support Intelligence Officer in the 3rd Infantry Division, Wurzburg, Germany. In 1993, Vares-Lum left active duty and joined the 29th Separate Infantry Brigade (SIB), Hawaii Army National Guard where she served as the 29th Support Battalion S-2, the 29th SIB Assistant S-2, the first 229th Military Intelligence Company Commander, and the 29th SIB G-2. She also served as the 2nd Battalion Commander, 298th MFTU, HIARNG. Following this position, she served as the Joint Forces Headquarters, Hawaii National Guard J2.  She later served as the commander of the 298th Regiment, Multifunctional Training Unit (RTI), Hawaii Army National Guard, where she was responsible for the Officer Candidate Program, NCOES and 11 B WLC and MOS-Q courses. She served as the Vice Chief of the Joint Staff and HING J2 and as the Chief of the Joint Staff, Hawaii National Guard.

Vares-Lum was mobilized in support of Operation Iraqi Freedom III from August 2004 to March 2006. As the 29th Infantry Brigade Combat Team S-2, she established and led the Joint Intelligence Center in Balad, Iraq.

Her military schools include the Military Intelligence Officer Basic Course, Military Intelligence Officer Advanced Course, Combined Arms and Services Staff School, Command and General Staff Officer's Course, the U.S. Army War College (DDE), Airborne School, and Air Assault School.

Awards and decorations

Other Awards
2017 Ellis Island Medal of Honor Recipient, nominated by USPACOM Commander Admiral Harris
2017 SEH Women's History Month Honoree Panel Member, Redefining Standards, Making a Difference, and Inspiring Others
2016 University of Hawaii ROTC Hall of Fame Inductee
2016 National ROTC Hall of Fame Inductee, Ft. Knox, Kentucky
2015 Knowlton Awardee for Military Intelligence Corps Professionals
2013 Hawaii National Guard Association Outstanding Army Officer of the Year
2011 U.S. Army War College Commandant's Writing Award for Research: Security in the Philippines and Indonesia: The U.S. Military Role in Southeast Asia

References

1967 births
American military personnel of Japanese descent
American military personnel of Native Hawaiian descent
American people of Chinese descent
American people of Native Hawaiian descent
American people of Portuguese descent
American people of Finnish descent
Female generals of the United States Army
Female United States Army officers
Hawaii National Guard personnel
Hawaii people of Chinese descent
Hawaii people of Japanese descent
Living people
Military personnel from Hawaii
People from Hawaii
People from Wahiawa, Hawaii
Recipients of the Defense Superior Service Medal
Recipients of the Legion of Merit
United States Army personnel of the Iraq War
United States Army War College alumni
University of Hawaiʻi at Mānoa alumni
Women in the Iraq War
21st-century American women